Three from Prostokvashino is a 1978 Soviet animated film based on the children's book Uncle Fedya, His Dog, and His Cat by Eduard Uspensky. The film has two sequels, Vacation in Prostokvashino (Каникулы в Простоквашино) (1980) and Winter in Prostokvashino (Зима в Простоквашино) (1984).

The main character is a six-year-old boy who is called Uncle Fyodor (voiced by Maria Vinogradova) because he is very serious. After his parents don't let him keep the talking cat Matroskin (voiced by Oleg Tabakov), Uncle Fyodor leaves his home. With the dog Sharik (voiced by Lev Durov), the three set up a home in the country village Prostokvashino ("soured milk"). There they have many adventures, some involving the local mailman, Pechkin (voiced by Boris Novikov).

The series has been a source of many quotable phrases in post-Soviet countries. It has made an impact comparable to Well, Just You Wait! in Russian culture.

Plot
Uncle Fyodor is a very independent city boy, "a boy on his own". After his mother forbids him from keeping his talking cat Matroskin, Uncle Fyodor runs away from home to live on his own. Uncle Fyodor and the cat arrive at the village Prostokvashino, where they meet the local dog Sharik. The three settle in an abandoned house.

Uncle Fyodor's parents became very agitated at the loss of their son, and even put out a missing persons notice in the paper... Such a notice couldn't pass the nose of the extremely curious postman Pechkin, who right then and there declared his hopes to earn a reward for the boy's safe return — a new bicycle.

By the end of the movie, the family is reunited, and the mailman receives his reward for notifying the parents. The parents tell the animals that they are welcome to come back to the city with them, but they decide to stay in Prostokvashino to make a summer house (dacha) for Fyodor.

Trivia
At the request of the director Vladimir Popov, work on the creation of screen images was divided between art directors. Levon Hachatryan worked on depictions of the mail carrier Pechkin, Uncle Fyodor, and his Father and Mother. Nikolay Erykalov worked on images of animals: the cat Matroskin, the dog Sharik, the cow Murka and her calf, Gavryusha.) The image of the jackdaw didn't turn out well for a long time; therefore, everyone who came into the drafting room for "Soyuzmultfilm", asked Leonid Shvartsman, the creator of Cheburashka's visual design, to try his hand at drawing the jackdaw.
Levon Hachatryan modeled Uncle Fyodor's mother after his wife, Larisa Myasnikova. "Small stature, short hairdo, wearing spectacles. Popov made the amendments ... in the sketch they were round as were worn by my wife, but Popov asserted that they were better square" (from Levon Hachatryan's records).
The animation of Uncle Fyodor's parents in 1978 is very similar to that of the parents of Junior in 1968 from the animated film Junior and Karlsson (that, however, isn't surprising as both movies had same art directors, and virtually the same group of animators).
Before "Prostokvashino", Nikolay Erykalov and Levon Hachatryan had worked together on the animated film "Bobik on a Visit at Barbos". There is a certain similarity between the protagonists of these two animated films.
The only depiction on which the team didn't come to a uniform decision is that of Uncle Fyodor. Therefore, his screen image changes drastically from episode to episode.
The episode where the mail carrier Pechkin knocks at the door, and the jackdaw answers "Who's there?", is very similar to a similar episode in the American educational television series The Electric Company (1971) where the plumber knocks at the door and is answered by a parrot.
The mail carrier Pechkin is very similar to citizen Kurochkin from Popov's animated adaptation of Adventures of Vasya Kurolesov (1981), especially as both heroes were voiced by actor Boris Novikov.
Before production of "Prostokvashino", there were existing animated films about Uncle Fyodor, shot by Studio Ekran in cutout equipment: Uncle Fyodor, the Dog, and the Cat (1975 — 1976).

External links

Prostokvashino (Простоквашино), trilogy (1978-84) - in English and Russian with subtitles at Soviet Cartoons Online

1978 films
Animated films about birds
Animated films about cats
Animated films about dogs
Animated films based on children's books
Films about postal systems
Films about runaways
Films based on works by Eduard Uspensky
1970s Russian-language films
Soviet animated films
Soyuzmultfilm